Glipa obliquivittata is a species of beetle in the genus Glipa. It was described in 1993.

References

obliquivittata
Beetles described in 1993